Rhagio punctipennis, the lesser variegated snipe fly, is a species of snipe flies in the family Rhagionidae.

References

Further reading

External links

 

Rhagionidae
Insects described in 1823